Isla Natividad Airstrip  is a private dirt airstrip located on the South East coast of Isla Natividad, Municipality of Mulegé,  Baja California Sur, Mexico, an island located in the Pacific Ocean, 6 km West of the Baja California Peninsula. The airstrip handles air traffic service for the fishing town of Natividad. The airstrip is handled by "Sociedad Cooperativa de Productos Pesqueros Buzos y Pescadores de la Baja California SCL", a fishing cooperative that exploits the fish resources that exist around the island.

Airports in Baja California Sur
Mulegé Municipality